Piet Rentmeester (27 August 1938 – 11 February 2017) was a Dutch professional racing cyclist. He won the Kuurne–Brussels–Kuurne race in 1962.

References

External links
 
 

1938 births
2017 deaths
Dutch male cyclists
People from Reimerswaal
Cyclists from Zeeland